Daniel John Felton (born February 5, 1955) is an American prelate of the Roman Catholic Church who has been serving as bishop for the Diocese of Duluth, Minnesota since 2021.

Biography

Early life 
Felton was born on February 5, 1955, in Portsmouth, Virginia, to Carol and Ken Felton. He has four younger siblings. Felton went to grade school at St. Edwards School in Mackville, Wisconsin , then attended to Appleton West High School in Appleton, Wisconsin. Felton then entered St. Norbert College in DePere, Wisconsin, graduating with a bachelor's degree in psychology and religious studies in 1977. Felton received his Master of Theology degree from St. John's University in St. Joseph, Minnesota in 1981.

Priesthood 
On June 13, 1981, Felton was ordained to the priesthood for the Diocese of Green Bay. He served as a parish priest in Manitowoc, Oshkosh, Mackville, and Greenville, all in Wisconsin. He received a Master of Social Communications degree from Pontifical Gregorian University in Rome and a Licentiate of Sacred Theology in dogmatic theology in 1990. In June 2014, Felton was named vicar general and moderator of the curia for the Diocese of Green Bay.

Bishop of Duluth 
Pope Francis appointed Felton as bishop for the Diocese of Duluth on April 7, 2021.  On May 20, 2021, Felton was consecrated by Archbishop Bernard Hebda, with Bishops David Ricken and Thomas Paprocki serving as co-consecrators.

See also

 Catholic Church hierarchy
 Catholic Church in the United States
 Historical list of the Catholic bishops of the United States
 List of Catholic bishops of the United States
 Lists of patriarchs, archbishops, and bishops

References

External links
Roman Catholic Diocese of Duluth Official Site

Episcopal succession

 

1955 births
Living people
American Roman Catholic priests
People from Portsmouth, Virginia
Bishops appointed by Pope Francis
Religious leaders from Wisconsin
Pontifical Gregorian University alumni